Gwen Rosemary Jorgensen (born April 25, 1986, in Waukesha, Wisconsin) is an American distance runner and former professional triathlete. She is the 2014 and 2015 ITU World Triathlon Series Champion. She has been named USA Triathlon's 2013 and 2014 Olympic/ITU Female Athlete of the Year. She was a member of the 2012 Olympic Team and again represented the United States in triathlon at the 2016 Summer Olympics, where she won the USA's first ever triathlon gold medal with a time of 1 hour, 56 minutes, and 16 seconds.

Career
Jorgensen attended the University of Wisconsin-Madison, where she swam and ran for the Badgers. She earned a master's degree in accounting, passed the CPA exam, and worked for Ernst & Young in Milwaukee as a tax accountant. Soon after graduating and beginning her new job, USA Triathlon, who was pursuing former college swimmers and runners, encouraged Jorgensen to enter the sport of triathlon. In 2010, she was selected as USA Triathlon's Rookie of the year following her silver medal at the World University Triathlon Championships in Spain.

At the 2011 World Championship Series in London, Jorgensen placed 2nd which earned her a spot on the 2012 US Olympic triathlon team. In the London Olympics she suffered a flat tire on the bike portion of the race and would finish in 38th place.

In 2014, Jorgensen placed first in four consecutive World Triathlon Series races, something no other female had done in the history of the series. Her winning streak extended through 2015, with a total of 13 consecutive series wins by the end of the year. Her astonishing streak was finally ended in 2016 by Helen Jenkins in Gold Coast, Australia. By coincidence, Jenkins had been the last competitor to have beaten her before her streak, in Cape Town in 2014. In 2015, she joined ECS Triathlon, an elite club, based in Sartrouville, France.

At the 2016 Summer Olympics, Jorgensen won gold in triathlon.  After winning the gold medal in Rio, Gwen entered the New York City Marathon and placed 14th with a time of 2:41:01.

Jorgensen announced via Twitter on January 19, 2017, that she and her husband were expecting a child. She gave birth to a boy, Stanley, on August 16, 2017 - almost two weeks after his due date.

In November 2017, Jorgensen announced that she was retiring from triathlon, and focusing on the marathon, with the goal of winning an Olympic gold in the discipline at Tokyo 2020. However, after suffering injuries and undergoing heel surgery during her marathon build-up, Jorgensen announced on December 4, 2019, that she will focus on qualifying in track, in either the 5,000m or 10,000m.

In October 2019, Jorgensen's mother and sister published Go, Gwen, Go: A Family’s Journey to Olympic Gold. In the book, they document Jorgensen's rise from a Milwaukee CPA to 2016 Olympic Champion and describe the family's experience raising an Olympian.

ITU competitions 
Jorgensen's ITU race results are:

References

External links 
 Official website
 USA Triathlon

1986 births
Living people
American female triathletes
Sportspeople from Milwaukee
Track and field athletes from Milwaukee
Sportspeople from Waukesha, Wisconsin
Triathletes at the 2011 Pan American Games
Wisconsin Badgers women's swimmers
Triathletes at the 2012 Summer Olympics
Triathletes at the 2016 Summer Olympics
Olympic triathletes of the United States
American accountants
Women accountants
Ernst & Young people
Olympic gold medalists for the United States in triathlon
Medalists at the 2016 Summer Olympics
Pan American Games competitors for the United States
20th-century American women
21st-century American women